Paung is a town in the Mon State of south-east Myanmar. Mt.Nwar-la-boet (Cow's hump Mt) in Kyon Ka Village is well known and at the top of the mountain, pilgrims can pay homage to the small stupa in which sacred hair relic of Buddha is enshrined. One can also enjoy the unique beauty of surroundings from there.

External links
Satellite map at Maplandia.com

Township capitals of Myanmar
Populated places in Mon State